Kavon Frazier (born August 11, 1994) is a former American football safety. He played college football at Central Michigan University.

Early years
Frazier attended Grand Rapids Christian High School, where he practiced football, basketball and track. In football, he was a three-year starter. As a junior, he was named to the all-conference team. He was a two-way player as a senior, registering 66 tackles, 858 rushing yards and 15 touchdowns, while receiving Division 3/4 All-state, Detroit Free Press All-Area and All-conference honors.

In basketball, he helped lead the team to a pair of conference titles and a district title as a senior.

College career
Frazier accepted a football scholarship from Central Michigan University. As a freshman, he appeared in 13 games, collecting 36 tackles, 3 passes defensed, one interception and one forced fumble. He had 11 tackless and one pass defensed against Navy.

As a sophomore, he appeared in 12 games (9 starts), registering 67 tackles (fourth on the team), 3 interceptions (tied for the team lead) and 5 passes defensed (tied for the team lead). He had 11 tackles (7 solos) against the University of Toledo.

As a junior, he appeared in 13 games (3 starts), posting 58 tackles (fourth on the team), 34 solo tackles, 4 passes defensed and one fumble recovery.

As a senior, he was the regular starter at strong safety, recording 108 tackles (led the team), 74 solo tackles (led the team), 4.5 tackles for a loss, 4 passes defensed, one interception and one blocked punt. He had 13 tackles against Oklahoma State University. He made 12 tackles against the University of Toledo. He is a member of Phi Beta Sigma fraternity.

Professional career

Dallas Cowboys
Frazier was selected by the Dallas Cowboys in the sixth round (212th overall) of the 2016 NFL Draft. As a rookie he played mainly on special teams and was declared inactive in 4 games. He tallied 2 defensive tackles and 4 special teams tackles.

In 2017, he finished second on the team with 11 special teams tackles. He began to be used more on the defense, making 32 tackles (2 for loss). He appeared in 15 contests and was declared inactive for the fifth game against the Green Bay Packers.

Prior to 2018 preseason, Frazier was placed on non-football-related injured reserve on July 26 due to him having a potential blood disorder. He was tested negative for haemophilia and other blood clotting disorders on August 3, putting him back on the active roster. He appeared in all 16 games, starting the first two games of the season in place of an injured Xavier Woods. He posted 18 tackles (one for loss), one sack, one quarterback pressure, 2 passes defensed and 8 special teams tackles (fourth on the team).

In 2019, he was the backup at strong safety, collecting 4 defensive tackles and one special teams tackle in the first four games of the season. On September 30, he was placed on the injured reserve with a pectoral injury. He was not re-signed after the season.

Miami Dolphins
On April 28, 2020, Frazier signed with the Miami Dolphins. He appeared in 15 games as a reserve player. He was declared inactive in the fourth game against the Seattle Seahawks.

Cincinnati Bengals
On May 27, 2021, Frazier signed with the Cincinnati Bengals. He was released on August 22, 2021.

Las Vegas Raiders
On December 2, 2021, Frazier was signed to the Las Vegas Raiders practice squad. After the Raiders were eliminated in the 2021 Wild Card round of the playoffs, he signed a reserve/future contract on January 17, 2022. He was released on March 8, 2022.

Retirement
On July 29, 2022, Frazier announced his retirement from professional football.

References

External links
Central Michigan Chippewas bio

1994 births
Living people
Players of American football from Grand Rapids, Michigan
American football safeties
Central Michigan Chippewas football players
Dallas Cowboys players
Miami Dolphins players
Cincinnati Bengals players
Las Vegas Raiders players